SailTimer is a technology for sailboat navigation, which calculates optimal tacking angles, distances and times.

Seafarers have had a dilemma for as long as sailboats could use lift to sail upwind.  Should you head off the wind more, to get more speed (but at a longer distance)?  Or should you sail upwind more, to lessen the distance (but at slower speed)?

Different sailboats have varying capabilities for sailing upwind because of the condition of their sails, the type of rigging, and the ability to track in the water based on their keel or centerboard design.  That means there is not a single rule for everyone;  each vessel has its own individual polar plot of boat speed for all of the possible wind angles. The mathematical calculations for determining the tacking angles and times with polar plots would not be practical to do mentally.

Rationale
Civilian access to GPS navigation became available circa 1989.  Estimated time of arrival (ETA) is a standard GPS chartplotter parameter, based on the assumption that the route will be a straight line to the destination.  However, sailboats typically tack back and forth, creating a longer distance than a straight line.

SailTimer evaluates tacking distances and boat speeds on different points of sail to determine optimal tacking headings.  During the original development of the SailTimer software in 2005-2006, the term TTD (tm) was coined for "Tacking Time to Destination".

Safe Navigation
Sailboats can be pushed downwind by the wind, or can use lift to move across or into the wind.  However, for most sailboats the boat speed drops if sailing closer than 45 degrees to the wind.  The highest speed for most sailboats is reaching with the wind from the side or the aft quarter (a beam reach or a broad reach).

If the destination is upwind but the sailboat goes fastest heading away from this direction, this poses a significant problem:  how to choose tack headings with the best tradeoff between maximimizing speed and minimizing distance.  The ability to define an efficient tacking route is an important issue in sailboat racing, and for recreational sailing.  It is also an important issue of navigational safety, so that the sailboat is able to arrive before dark.  Being able to accurately calculate the Tacking Time to Destination also allows a skipper to select a course that avoids bad weather or shipping traffic.

Versions
Given the widespread growth of smartphones, a version of SailTimer is available from the App Store (iOS) for iPhone, iPod and iPad tablets.

SailTimer also runs on a dedicated handheld device called The Sailing GPS.  An artificial intelligence algorithm allows it to learn the polar plots for an individual sailboat, which it then uses for making decisions on the optimal tacking route and Tacking Time to Destination.

References

External links
www.SailTimerApp.com
www.TheSailingGPS.com

Sailing
Marine electronics
Navigational equipment
Global Positioning System